Lorelly Wilson is a British chemist, educator and founder of Chemistry with Cabbage, hands-on workshops to inspire students to study science. She is a Fellow of the Royal Society of Chemistry and was awarded an MBE in 2016 for services to education.

Wilson began her career at Imperial Chemical Industries before starting to work in education outreach, running workshops for schools and working with the Royal Society of Chemistry to develop educational resources for teachers. Chair of the British Science Association's North West branch, Wilson runs SciBar events across the region, inviting experts to pubs and bars to bring science to the general public.

In her spare time Wilson plays the viola and is the editor for a talking newspaper for people who are blind or partially sighted.

References 

British women scientists
Members of the Order of the British Empire
Living people
Year of birth missing (living people)
People from Knutsford